Brandon D. Anderson is an American sociologist and entrepreneur. He is the Founder and Chief Executive Officer of Raheem.ai, a chatbot which helps the public monitor police interactions. He was the 2018 Echoing Green Black Male Achievement Fellow and is a 2019 TED fellow.

Early life 
Anderson was born in Oklahoma. His mother is a rental car clerk and his father a forklift truck driver. He has described his childhood as being "characterised by violence". He was kicked out of his grandparents house as a teenager and made homeless. Anderson ran away with his best friend, with whom he later fell in love. Anderson enlisted in the Army in 2003, where he worked as a satellite engineer. In 2007, while Anderson was serving as an engineer in the army overseas, his partner was shot and killed by a police officer during a routine traffic stop. Anderson was discharged from the Army once he disclosed his sexuality.

Education and career 
Anderson became a community activist and organiser, earning a degree at Georgetown University in 2015. At Georgetown he studied sociology and philosophy. He served as a Racial Equity Fellow at the Washington, D.C. Center for the Study of Social Policy. Anderson learned that the majority of people don't report negative interactions with police officers because they "do not trust the system".

In 2014 Anderson was awarded money from Fast ForWord and the My Brother's Keeper Challenge to build Raheem.ai, a Facebook messenger chatbot that eliminates barriers to reporting police misconduct. The  chatbot allows the public to evaluate police interactions and offers follow-on support for users. Raheem.ai was inspired by Waze, who, alongside offering navigation information, use user-generated information to inform local government about fill potholes. The chatbot asks questions about recent interactions with the police, anonymises the data that is collected and shares them in real-time to a public dashboard on police performance. Raheem.ai publishes reports about where police are working well and where they are failing communities. It aims to reach all fifty states by 2020. With Raheem.ai Anderson looks to build the first crowdsourced database of police interactions.

In 2016 Anderson delivered a TED talk at Georgetown, where he discussed what it means to be vulnerable. He was named as one of the National Black Justice Coalition 100 Black LGBTQ/SGL Emerging Leaders. Anderson was made an Echoing Green Fellow in 2018.

References 

21st-century American businesspeople
Georgetown College (Georgetown University) alumni
African-American activists
Year of birth missing (living people)
Living people
21st-century African-American people
American military personnel discharged for homosexuality
United States Army soldiers
American LGBT businesspeople
LGBT African Americans